Black Satellite is an American rock band from New York, NY consisting of lead vocalist Larissa Vale and guitarist Kyle Hawken. Their debut album Endless was released on July 7, 2017. Following the release of their single Valkyrie in April 2017, Black Satellite was booked as support for Starset during their 2017 Vessels tour. Their follow-up single Blind premiered on idobi radio on May 11, 2017. Black Satellite was named one of Alternative Press' "12 Bands You Need To Know" in the January 2018 print issue of the magazine.  The band released two cover songs by Type O Negative as a tribute to late vocalist Peter Steele on April 14, 2018. Black Satellite have announced their second studio album Aftermath with the release of a new single Void on August 14, 2020 mixed by Ben Grosse. The band is scheduled to tour with Fozzy, Through Fire, and Royal Bliss on the Save The World Tour in 2020. In 2021, they toured with Nita Strauss.

Discography

Studio albums 
 Endless (July 7, 2017)
 Aftermath (TBA)

Singles 

 "I Don't Wanna Be Me" (April 14, 2018)
 "My Girlfriend's Girlfriend (April 14, 2018)

References 

Rock music groups from New York (state)